Greenwich was a town in Hampshire County, Massachusetts. The town was lost as a result of the formation of the Quabbin Reservoir in order to supply Boston's growing water needs.

History

Greenwich was established in 1739 as Quabbin, incorporated as Quabbin Parish in 1754, and became the town of Greenwich (named for John Campbell, Duke of Greenwich) in 1754. It was located along the East and Middle branches of the Swift River. The Athol Branch of the Boston and Albany Railroad ran through the center of town, as did Route 21. It was well known for its lakes and ponds, which were popular vacation spots. It bordered four towns—Enfield, Prescott, Dana, and Hardwick.

H. P. Lovecraft's fictional town of Dunwich in his seminal story "The Dunwich Horror" was partially based on the town of Greenwich. Additionally, Lovecraft's story "The Colour Out of Space" is set in this valley before it was flooded for the reservoir.

Greenwich was disincorporated on April 28, 1938, as part of the creation of the Quabbin Reservoir. Upon disincorporation, portions of the town were annexed to the adjacent towns of Hardwick, New Salem, Petersham, and Ware. (Because of the redrawing of town lines, the land is no longer completely in Hampshire County; only the portion located in Ware is.) Because most of Greenwich was at lower elevation than the surrounding towns, it is now largely submerged, except for the hilltops of Curtis Hill, Mount Lizzie and Mount Pomeroy, which are now islands.

Notable residents
 Mason C. Darling (1801–1866), Massachusetts and Wisconsin physician, legislator
 Joseph Pomeroy Root (1826–1885), Free Stater, first Lieutenant Governor of Kansas
 Randolph Barnes Marcy (1812-1887), Major General, U.S. Army, Civil War
 Amiel Weeks Whipple (1816-1863), Major General, U.S. Army; mortally wounded at the Battle of Chancellorsville, May 3, 1863; died on May 7

Related
Greenwich House, an on-campus living facility at Hampshire College in Amherst, Massachusetts, is named after the former town.

References

 Tougias, Michael.  Quabbin: A History and Explorer's Guide.  Yarmouth Port, Mass.: On Cape Publications, 2002.

External links
 
Map showing the towns buried under Quabbin as they looked in 1912, with original house locations and current reservoir water level

Defunct towns in Massachusetts
Submerged settlements in the United States
Ghost towns in Massachusetts
Populated places in Hampshire County, Massachusetts
Populated places established in 1739
1938 disestablishments in Massachusetts
1739 establishments in Massachusetts
Populated places disestablished in 1938